The Wǔfāng Shàngdì ( "Five Regions' Highest Deities" or "Highest Deities of the Five Regions"), or simply Wǔdì ( "Five Deities") or Wǔshén ( "Five Gods") are, in Chinese canonical texts and common Chinese religion, the fivefold manifestation of the supreme God of Heaven ( Tiān). This theology dates back at least to the Shang dynasty. Described as the "five changeable faces of Heaven", they represent Heaven's cosmic activity which shapes worlds as tán , "altars", imitating its order which is visible in the starry vault, the north celestial pole and its spinning constellations. The Five Deities themselves represent these constellations. In accordance with the Three Powers ( Sāncái) they have a celestial, a terrestrial and a chthonic form. The Han Chinese identify themselves as the descendants of the Red and Yellow Deities.

They are associated with the five colors, the five phases of the continuous creation, the five key planets of the Solar System and the five constellations rotating around the celestial pole, the five sacred mountains and five directions of space (their terrestrial form), and the five Dragon Gods ( Lóngshén) who represent their mounts, that is to say the material forces they preside over (their chthonic form). They have also been defined simply as five special forms of the worship of the God of Heaven, different "accesses" or perspectives, suitable for different situations, to serve Heaven.

According to Zheng Xuan, the influence of their activity begets different categories of beings on earth. Explaining the ancient theology about the origins of kings from Heaven's impregnation of earthly women, he commented:

Names and meanings
Other names by which the Five Deities are collectively known are:
 Wǔfāng Tiānshén ( "Five Regions' Heavenly Deities");
 Wǔfāngdì ( "Five Regions' Deities");
 Wǔtiāndì ( "Five Heavenly Deities");
 Wǔlǎojūn ( "Five Olden Lords");
 Wǔdàoshén ( "Five Ways God(s)");
 Xiāntiān Wǔdì ( "Five Deities of the Former Heaven");
 Wǔsèdì ( "Five Colors' Deities").

In some works they are conceptualized as a single deity, the "Great Deity the Heavenly King" ( Tiānhuáng Dàdì) or "Highest Deity of the Vast Heaven" ( Hàotiān Shàngdì), which are therefore other epithets for the supreme God of Heaven.

Huangdi—Yellow Deity

Huángdì ( "Yellow Emperor" or "Yellow Deity"), also called Huángshén ( "Yellow God"), is another name of the supreme God in Chinese traditions, associated to the northern culmen of the sky and the Big Dipper (or Great Chariot, or Ursa Major) in particular, and with the power of the wu ( shamans). He is also known, as a human culture hero and progenitor, as Xuānyuán ( "Chariot Shaft"), Xuānyuánshì ( "Master of the Chariot Shaft"), or Xuānyuán Huángdì ( "Yellow Deity of the Chariot Shaft"), and as a cosmological symbol as Zhōngyuèdàdì ( "Great Deity of the Central Peak"). He represents the essence of earth and the Yellow Dragon ( Huánglóng). The character  huáng, for "yellow", also means, by homophony and shared etymology with  huáng, "august", "creator" and "radiant", attributes of the supreme God.

He is the deity who shapes the material world ( Dì), the creator of the Huaxia civility, of marriage and morality, language and lineage, and primal ancestor of all the Chinese. In the cosmology of the Wufang Shangdi his astral body is Saturn, but he is also identified as the Sun God, and with the star Regulus (α Leonis) and constellations Leo and Lynx, of which the latter is said to represent the body of the Yellow Dragon.

He corresponds to the Huángshén Běidǒu ( "Yellow God of the Northern Dipper"), of whom in certain historical sources he is described as the human form making an ontological distinction between the two. For instance, according to a definition given by apocryphal texts related to the Hétú , the Yellow Emperor "proceeds from the essence of the Yellow God of the Northern Dipper", is born to "a daughter of a chthonic deity", and as such he is "a cosmic product of the conflation of Heaven and Earth". The Yellow God is in turn described as the "spirit father and astral double" of the Yellow Emperor.

As a human being, the Yellow Emperor is said to have been the fruit of a virginal birth, as his mother Fubao was impregnated by a radiance (yuanqi, "primordial pneuma"), a lightning, which she saw encircling the Northern Dipper (Great Chariot, or Ursa Major), or the celestial pole, while she was walking in the countryside. She delivered her son after twenty-four months on the mount of Shou (Longevity) or mount Xuanyuan, after which he was named. Through his human side, he was a descendant of  Yǒuxióng, the lineage of the Bear—another reference to the Ursa Major. Scholar John C. Didier has studied the parallels that the Yellow Emperor's mythology has in other cultures, deducing a plausible ancient origin of the myth in Siberia or in north Asia.

In older accounts, the Yellow Emperor is identified as a deity of light (and his name is explained in the Shuowen Jiezi to derive from guāng , "light") and thunder, and as one and the same with the "Thunder God" ( Léishén), who in turn, as a later mythological character, is distinguished as the Yellow Emperor's foremost pupil, such as in the Huangdi Neijing.

Huangdi represents the hub of creation, the axis mundi (Kunlun) that is the manifestation of the divine order in physical reality, opening the way to immortality. As the deity of the centre of the four directions, in the Shizi he is described as "Yellow Emperor with Four Faces" ( Huángdì Sìmiàn). The "Four-Faced God" or "Ubiquitous God" ( Sìmiànshén) is also the Chinese name of Brahma. Huangdi is the model of those who merge their self with the self of the universal God, of the ascetics who reach enlightenment or immortality.

In Sima Qian's description of the Five Deities it is important to note that the Yellow Emperor was portrayed as the grandfather of the Black Emperor of the north who personifies as well the pole stars, and as the tamer of the Red Emperor, his half-brother, who is the spirit of the southern populations known collectively as Chu in the Zhou dynasty.

Cangdi—Bluegreen Deity

Cāngdì ( "Green Deity" or "Green Emperor") or Cāngshén ( "Green God"), also known as Qīngdì ( "Blue Deity" or "Bluegreen Deity") or Qīngshén ( "Bluegreen God"), and cosmologically as the Dōngdì ( "East Deity") or Dōngyuèdàdì ( "Great Deity of the Eastern Peak", which is Mount Tai), is the manifestation of the supreme God associated with the essence of wood and spring, for which he is worshipped as the god of fertility. The Bluegreen Dragon ( Qīnglóng) is both his animal form and constellation, and as a human he was Tàihào  (Fu Xi). His female consort is the goddess of fertility Bixia. His astral body is Jupiter.

Heidi—Black Deity

Hēidì ( "Black Deity" or "Black Emperor") or Hēishén ( "Black God"), also known as the cosmological Běidì ( "North Deity") or Běiyuèdàdì ( "Great Deity of the Northern Peak"), and identified as Zhuānxū, today frequently worshipped as Xuánwǔ ( "Dark Warrior") or Zhēnwǔ, is the manifestation of the supreme God associated with the essence of water and winter. His animal form is the Black Dragon ( Xuánlóng, literally "Dark Dragon" or "Mysterious Dragon") and his stellar animal is the tortoise-snake. His astral body is Mercury.

Chidi—Red Deity

Chìdì ( "Red Deity" or "Red Emperor") or Chìshén ( "Red God"), also known as the Nándì ( "South Deity") or Nányuèdàdì ( "Great Deity of the Southern Peak"), as a human was Shénnóng ( "Farmer God" or "Plowing God"), who is also the same as Yándì ( "Flame Deity" or "Fiery Deity"), a function occupied by different gods and god-kings in mytho-history. Shennong is also one of the Three Patrons, specifically the patron of humanity ( Rénhuáng), and the point of intersection of the Three Patrons and Huangdi.

He is also associated with Chīyóu, the god of some southern peoples, in both iconography and myth, as both Shennong Yandi and Chiyou fought against the Yellow Emperor, although Chiyou is traditionally considered more violent and has the horns of a fighting bull, while Shennong Yandi is more peaceful and has the horns of a plowing buffalo.

He is the manifestation of the supreme God associated with the essence of fire; his animal form is the Red Dragon ( Zhūlóng) and his stellar animal is the phoenix. He is the god of agriculture, animal husbandry, medicinal plants and market. In broader conceptualisation, he is the god of science and craft, and the patron of doctors and apothecaries. His astral body is Mars.

Baidi—White Deity

Báidì ( "White Emperor" or "White Deity") or Báishén ( "White God"), also known as the Xīdì ( "West Deity") or Xīyuèdàdì ( "Great Deity of the Western Peak"), as a human was Shǎohào, and he is the manifestation of the supreme God associated with the essence of metal and autumn. His animal form is the White Dragon ( Báilóng) and his stellar animal is the tiger. His astral body is Venus.

Contrast between the Red and the Yellow Deities

In mythology, Huangdi and Yandi fought a battle against each other; and Huang finally defeated Yan with the help of the Dragon (the controller of water, who is Huangdi himself).

This myth symbolises the equipoise of yin and yang, here the fire of knowledge (reason and craft) and earthly stability. Yan  is flame, scorching fire, or an excess of it (it is important to notice that graphically it is a double  huo, "fire").

As an excess of fire brings destruction to the earth, it has to be controlled by a ruling principle. Nothing is good in itself, without limits; good outcomes depend on the proportion in the composition of things and their interactions, never on extremes in absolute terms. Huangdi and Yandi are complementary opposites, necessary for the existence of one another, and they are powers that exist together within the human being.

History of the cult of the Five Deities

The worship of the Five Deities by both commoners and rulers of China is a very ancient practice, dating back at least to the Neolithic. Already in the theology of the Shang dynasty, the supreme God of Heaven (Shangdi or Di) was conceived as manifesting in a fourfold form and will, the four  fāng ("directions" or "sides") and their  fēng ("winds").

Qin dynasty

The official religion and ritual of the state of Qin (9th century BCE–221 BCE) was largely based on that of the Zhou dynasty (c. 1046 BCE–256 BCE). The emperors worshipped the supreme God at a location in the suburbs of their capital Xianyang. The cults of the White, Green, Yellow and Red Deities had been celebrated separately in different parts of the state. In 677 BCE, Yong, an ancient sacred site where the Yellow Emperor himself was said to have sacrificed and the Zhou dynasty carried out jiào  rituals, or "suburban sacrifices", became the capital of Qin.

It is attested that in 671 BCE, Duke Xuan (675–664) carried out the sacrifices for the Green Deity in Mi, south of the Wei River. Then, Duke Ling (?–384) instituted the sacred sites of Shàng ( "Above") and Xià ( "Below"), for the Yellow and Red Deities, in Wuyang, near Yong. Originally, the sacrifice for the White Deity had been carried out in 769 BCE by Duke Xiang (778–766) in Xi, near Lanzhou in Gansu. In 753 they were carried out by Duke Wen (765–716) in Fu, northeast Shaanxi.

In 253 BCE the great-grandfather of Qin Shihuang unified the imperial cult of the four forms of God in Yong, constructing there altars for the White, Green, Yellow and Red Deities. In 219, Qin Shihuang, founder of the Qin empire (221 BCE–206 BCE), personally sacrificed at Mount Tai, the sacred mountain at the centre of Shandong, a site for the worship of the supreme godhead in the erstwhile states of Qi and Lu. He modelled the sacrifice on that performed at Yong, in alignment with the Qin tradition, consisting of three types of victims—horses, rams and oxen.

Han dynasty

The ritual system of the early emperors of the Han dynasty (206 BCE–220 AD) was not different from that of the Qin, with the only change consisting in the integration of the Black Deity by Gaozu or Liu Bang (206–195), the first emperor of the dynasty. However, Han state religion soon found itself divided between two factions. On one hand there were the Confucians who pushed for a new ritual system and a religio-political centralisation around the worship of the God of Heaven by the emperor, the God of Heaven's son, and the worship of lesser deities who had to be approved by the Confucians themselves, who considered themselves the only ones capable of interpreting the signs of Heaven in accordance with the classics. On the other hand, there were the fangshi ( "masters of directions"), ritual masters who formulated what would have been called the "Huang–Lao" proto-Taoist religious movement, who presented themselves as the continuators of the traditions of the erstwhile kingdoms, and who emphasised the worship of local deities integrated into a theology in which the supreme God of Heaven was named Taiyi ("Great One"), and its human manifestation was the ancestral Yellow Emperor whom the emperors had to imitate.

The imperial temple at Yong which was established by the great-grandfather of Qin Shihuang was rearranged placing the altars of the gods each in its respective direction, and that of the Yellow Deity at the centre. Outside Yong, two other temples dedicated to the Five Deities were built during the reign of Emperor Wen (180–157), one in Weiyang, northeast of Chang'an, and one in Chengji near the modern county of Tongwei in Gansu. The sacrifices at Yong held a central positions and were carried out every three years by the emperor. If the emperor was absent, the rituals were performed by masters of rites, at various times throughout the year based on the ritual calendar of the Qin.

In 113 BCE, Emperor Wu of Han innovated the Confucian state religion integrating the Huang–Lao conception of Taiyi with the Five Deities and the cult of Houtu ("Queen of the Earth"). In 135 BCE, the fangshi Miu Ji, from Bo in modern Shandong, insisted that Taiyi was the same supreme God, master of the Five Deities, worshipped since remote antiquity by the emperors through the three-victims sacrifice. The rite lasted seven days and took place at a temple with "eight entrances for the numina" in the southeastern suburb of the capital. In conformity with the instructions of Miu Ji, the emperor built a temple in the outskirts of Chang'an and appointed a great invocator (taizhu) to conduct the sacrifices. Twenty years later—under the influence of another prominent court fangshi, Gongsun Qing—the sacrifice was held by the emperor in person. Regarding the liturgy, sacrificial protocol and architectural layout, the sites of Ganquan and Mount Tai followed the model of Yong. Besides the highest gods of the pantheon, the emperor or the central administration celebrated the cults of other gods, including those devoted to mountains and rivers, the sun and moon, stars and constellations, and heroes.

In later times the expansion of the empire to different provinces and peoples was accompanied by a policy of identification or association of native gods and their cults to the imperial Han pantheon, so that the cults officially celebrated by the administration proliferated to the hundreds. In 31 BCE, Confucians at the court, especially Kuang Heng and Zhang Tan, disposed a reform of the state sacrifices, suppressing hundreds of local sacrifices and restricting those performed by the emperor in person only to the worship of Taiyi and Houtu, or Heaven and Earth.

See also
 Three Sovereigns and Five Emperors

Associations
 Jade Emperor
 Three Sovereigns and Five Emperors, mytho-historical personalities
 五福大帝 Wǔfúdàdì—Five Blessing Great Deities, Fuzhou localised version, known as Emperor Wufu or Wufu Emperor in English
 五顯大帝 Wǔxiǎndàdì—Five Manifest Great Deities, Taoist adaptation, also known as the "Great Thearch and Divine agent of Five Manifestations", but not related to similarly named deities such as the Wutong Shen
 五方如來 Wǔfāngrúlái— Five Tathagatas
 五大仙 Wǔdàxiān—Northeast China's zoomorphic version
 Tenno taitei

General articles
 Chinese folk religion
 Chinese gods and immortals
 Chinese theology
 Sanxing (deities)
 Four Symbols
 Color in Chinese culture
 List of Journey to the West characters
 Astra Planeta (the Classical planets in Greco-Roman mythology).

Notes

References

Citations

Sources
 
 
  Volume I: The Ancient Eurasian World and the Celestial Pivot, Volume II: Representations and Identities of High Powers in Neolithic and Bronze China, Volume III: Terrestrial and Celestial Transformations in Zhou and Early-Imperial China.
 . Consulted HAL-SHS version, pages 1–56.
 
 
  Original preserved at The British Library. Digitalised in 2014.
 
 
  Two volumes: 1) A-L; 2) L-Z.
 
 
 

Deities in Chinese folk religion
 
Religious Confucianism
Wufang Shangdi